Vlaović is a surname. Notable people with the surname include:

Goran Vlaović (born 1972), Croatian footballer
Milana Vlaović (born 1971), Croatian journalist, composer, writer, and columnist

See also
 Vlahović (disambiguation)

Croatian surnames